Jakub Langhammer (born August 17, 1984) is a Czech professional ice hockey player. He is current a free agent having last played for HK Martin of the Slovak 1. Liga.

Before turning professional, Langhammer played for two seasons in the Western Hockey League of the Spokane Chiefs from 2002 to 2004. He went on to play 463 games in the Czech Extraliga for HC Sparta Praha, HC České Budějovice, Mountfield HK and HC Slavia Praha. He also played in the Tipsport Liga for MHk 32 Liptovský Mikuláš.

References

External links

1984 births
Living people
Czech ice hockey forwards
ETC Crimmitschau players
Dresdner Eislöwen players
MHk 32 Liptovský Mikuláš players
Manchester Phoenix players
MHC Martin players
BK Mladá Boleslav players
Motor České Budějovice players
IHC Písek players
EV Regensburg players
Saale Bulls Halle players
HC Slavia Praha players
HC Slezan Opava players
HC Sparta Praha players
Spokane Chiefs players
Sportspeople from Kladno
Stadion Hradec Králové players
HC Tábor players
Czech expatriate ice hockey players in the United States
Czech expatriate ice hockey players in Germany
Czech expatriate ice hockey players in Slovakia
Czech expatriate sportspeople in England
Expatriate ice hockey players in England